Eriphosoma is a genus of beetles in the family Cerambycidae, containing the following species:

 Eriphosoma barbiellinii Melzer, 1922
 Eriphosoma bipartitum (Buquet in Guérin-Méneville, 1844)
 Eriphosoma jacobi Fuchs, 1961
 Eriphosoma marcela Napp & Monne, 2006
 Eriphosoma mermudes Napp & Monne, 2006

References

Heteropsini